Jervy A. Cruz (born September 9, 1986) is a Filipino professional basketball player for the Davao Occidental Tigers of the Pilipinas Super League (PSL).

A former Most Valuable Player in the UAAP, Cruz was one of the reasons why the UST Growling Tigers pulled off an upset over heavily favored Ateneo Blue Eagles in the 2006 UAAP finals.

Tabbed fifth overall in the rookie draft, Rain or Shine got a legitimate inside threat and eased the burden on Jay-R Reyes in that aspect. Cruz is undersized for his position but he has the skills to become efficient. He also has a decent outside shot.

Cruz was the third youngest player in the 2009–10 season at only 23 years of age. He played 45 games and he averaged 6.4 points per game, 0.2 blocks per game, and 4.4 rebounds per game.

After six seasons for Rain or Shine, he was sent initially to GlobalPort for Jewel Ponferada but never played for them as he was traded after more than a month to Barako for Rico Maierhofer.

Cruz was traded again by Barako to Ginebra in exchange for Rodney Brondial and a 2018 second round pick after only four games into the 2015–16 season.

PBA career statistics

As of the end of 2021 season

Season-by-season

|-
| align=left | 
| align=left | Rain or Shine
| 45 || 15.8 || .436 || .000 || .658 || 4.4 || .2 || .1 || .2 || 6.0
|-
| align=left | 
| align=left | Rain or Shine
| 34 || 13.8 || .369 || – || .558 || 4.8 || .4 || .3 || .1 || 4.1
|-
| align=left | 
| align=left | Rain or Shine
| 51 || 14.9 || .506 || .000 || .729 || 4.4 || .6 || .2 || .2 || 6.7
|-
| align=left | 
| align=left | Rain or Shine
| 57 || 21.2 || .482 || – || .730 || 6.3 || .8 || .4 || .4 || 8.8
|-
| align=left | 
| align=left | Rain or Shine
| 58 || 17.5 || .473 || – || .653 || 4.8 || .8 || .2 || .2 || 6.3
|-
| align=left | 
| align=left | Rain or Shine
| 44 || 13.4 || .470 || .000 || .674 || 3.4 || .6 || .2 || .1 || 4.7
|-
| align=left rowspan=2| 
| align=left | Barako Bull
| rowspan=2|42 || rowspan=2|10.1 || rowspan=2|.433 || rowspan=2|.000 || rowspan=2|.683 || rowspan=2|2.7 || rowspan=2|.4 || rowspan=2|.2 || rowspan=2|– || rowspan=2|3.3
|-
| align=left | Barangay Ginebra
|-
| align=left | 
| align=left | Barangay Ginebra
| 42 || 11.2 || .407 || .000 || .794 || 2.7 || .6 || .2 || .1 || 4.6
|-
| align=left | 
| align=left | Barangay Ginebra
| 32 || 14.0 || .424 || .250 || .750 || 3.6 || .8 || .1 || .1 || 5.2
|-
| align=left rowspan=2| 
| align=left | Barangay Ginebra
| rowspan=2|31 || rowspan=2|10.6 || rowspan=2|.402 || rowspan=2|.304 || rowspan=2|.889 || rowspan=2|2.8 || rowspan=2|.5 || rowspan=2|.1 || rowspan=2|.1 || rowspan=2|3.9
|-
| align=left | NorthPort
|-
| align=left | 
| align=left | NorthPort
| 11 || 16.9 || .379 || .294 || .684 || 5.5 || .8 || .4 || – || 6.2
|-
| align=left | 
| align=left | NorthPort
| 2 || 6.7 || .400 || .000 || .500 || 1.5 ||.5 || – || – || 2.5
|-class=sortbottom
| colspan=2 align=center | Career
| 449 || 14.8 || .449 || .255 || .705 || 4.2 || .6 || .2 || .1 || 5.6

References

External links
 Player Profile at PBA-Online!

1987 births
Living people
Barako Bull Energy players
Barangay Ginebra San Miguel players
Basketball players from Nueva Ecija
Philippines men's national basketball team players
Filipino men's basketball players
Power forwards (basketball)
Rain or Shine Elasto Painters players
UST Growling Tigers basketball players
Southeast Asian Games gold medalists for the Philippines
Southeast Asian Games medalists in basketball
Competitors at the 2007 Southeast Asian Games
NorthPort Batang Pier players
Rain or Shine Elasto Painters draft picks